Kehinde Yisa Anifowoshe (born 11 October 1992) is a Nigerian  professional footballer who last played as a centre back as well as operating as a defensive midfielder for  Bangladesh Premier League club Chittagong Abahani.

Club career

MFM FC
Anifowoshe signed for Nigeria Professional Football League side MFM F.C. in January 2016.

1º de Agosto
He then signed with Angola Angolan League side 1º de Agosto in January 2018.

Lobi Stars
Kehinde returned to Nigeria and sign with Nigeria Professional Football League club, Lobi Stars, for 2 years.

Bahrain SC
On 5 February 2021 he joined Bahraini football club Bahrain SC.

Honours
1º de Agosto
Angolan League: 2018, 2019

References

External links
 

1992 births
Living people
Nigerian footballers
Nigerian expatriate footballers
Nigeria Professional Football League players
MFM F.C. players
Lobi Stars F.C. players
C.D. Primeiro de Agosto players
Sportspeople from Lagos
Association football defenders